Michael Maestlin (also Mästlin, Möstlin, or Moestlin) (30 September 1550 – 26 October 1631) was a German astronomer and mathematician, known for being the mentor of Johannes Kepler. He was a student of Philipp Apian and was known as the teacher who most influenced Kepler. Maestlin was considered to be one of the most significant astronomers between the time of Copernicus and Kepler.

Early life and family 
Maestlin was born on September 30, 1550 in Göppingen, a small town in Southern Germany, about 50 kilometers east of Tübingen. The son of Jakob Maestlin and Dorothea Simon, Michael Maestlin was born into a Protestant family. Maestlin had an older sister named Elisabeth and a younger brother named Matthäus. The original family name of the Maestlin was Leckher or Legecker and they lived in the village of Boll, just a few kilometers south of Göppingen (Decker 103). In his autobiography, Maestlin recounts how the family name of Legecker became Mästlin. He claims that one of his ancestors was given this as a nickname when an old blind woman touched him and exclaimed "Wie bist du doch so mast und feist! Du bist ein rechter Mästlin!" This roughly translates to "How are you so large and plump? You rightly are a fatso!"

Maestlin married Margarete Grüniger on 9 April 1577. There is little information on his children from this marriage. However, it is known that he had at least three sons, Ludwig, Michael and Johann Georg, and at least three daughters, Margareta, Dorothea Ursula and Anna Maria. In 1588, Margarete died at the age of 37, potentially due to complications from child birth. This untimely death left several children under Maestlin's care and could have influenced his decision to remarry the following year. In 1589, Maestlin married Margarete Burkhardt. Maestlin and Burkhardt had eight children together. In a 1589 letter to Johannes Kepler, Maestlin recounts how the death of his month-old son, August, deeply troubled him.

Education 
In 1565, when Michael was around 15 years old, he was sent to the nearby Klosterschule in Königbronn. In 1567, Michael transferred to a similar school in Herrenalb. Upon finishing his education at Herrenalb, Maestlin enrolled in university, matriculating on 3 December 1568 at the University of Tübingen. When Maestlin entered the university in 1569 he did so as one of the beneficiaries of a scholarship from the duke of Württemberg. He studied theology at the Tübinger Stift, which was founded in 1536 by Duke Ulrich von Württemberg, and was regarded as an elite institution of education. He obtained his Baccalaureate in 1569 and his master's degree in 1571. After receiving his masters degree Maestlin remained at the university as a student in theology and as a tutor in the theological seminary church located in Württemberg. In letters sent to Maestlin regarding his qualifications, it was revealed that he graduated summa cum laude and ranked third in his graduating class of twenty. During the time he spent on earning his master's degree, Maestlin studied under Philipp Apian. It is not certain, but it is believed that Apian taught courses on Frisius's Arithmetic, Euclid's Elements, Proclus's Sphera, Peurbach's Theoricae Novae Planetarus, and the proper use of geodetic instruments. Apian's teachings evidently influenced Maestlin's paper on sundials as the contents of this essay involve elements of structured celestial globes and maps.

In 1584, Maestlin was named Professor of Mathematics at Tübingen. He was elected Dean of the Arts Faculty for the following terms: 1588-89, 1594–95, 1600–01, 1607–09, 1610–11, 1615, 1623, and 1629. Maestlin taught trigonometry and astronomy. It was very likely that he used his book Epitome Astronomiae in his lectures.

In 1576 Maestlin had been sent to be a deacon at the Lutheran church in Backnang, a town about 30 kilometers Northwest of Göppingen. While there, he observed a comet that appeared in 1577. Tycho Brahe in Denmark observed the same comet, and from observations of its parallax, both Tycho and Maestlin were able to determine that the comet must be above the moon, contrary to the astronomical theories of both Aristotle and Ptolemy. Maestlin concluded that, in the Copernican system, the comet must lie in a region between the sphere of Venus and that of the Earth and Moon. Maestlin served as the Duke's chief scientific adviser from 1577–1580.

Career
Maestlin studied theology, mathematics, and astronomy/astrology at the University of Tübingen—the Tübinger Stift. (Tübingen was part of the Duchy of Württemberg.) He graduated as magister in 1571 and became in 1576 a Lutheran deacon in Backnang, continuing his studies there.

In 1580 he became a professor of mathematics, first at the University of Heidelberg, then at the University of Tübingen, where he taught for 47 years from 1583. In 1582 Maestlin wrote a popular introduction to astronomy. While teaching at the university Maetslin tho a Copernican taught traditional Ptolemaic astronomy in his courses. However, Maestlin did present Copernican's heliocentric astronomy to his advanced students.

Among his students was Johannes Kepler (1571–1630) who considered Maestlin not only a teacher, but also a lifelong mentor. Although he primarily taught the traditional geocentric Ptolemaic view of the solar system, Maestlin was also one of the first to accept and teach the heliocentric Copernican view. Maestlin corresponded with Kepler frequently and played a sizable part in his adoption of the Copernican system. Galileo Galilei's adoption of heliocentrism was also attributed to Maestlin.

The first known calculation  of the (inverse) golden ratio as a decimal of "about 0.6180340" was written in 1597 by Maestlin on a letter he got from to Kepler about Kepler triangle

Michael Maestlin was one of the very few astronomers of the sixteenth century that fully adopted the Copernican hypothesis, that proposed that the Earth was a planet and that it moved around the sun. 1570 he acquired an edition of his main work De revolutionibus orbium coelestium (his edition with many commentaries is in Schaffhausen). Maestlin reacted to the thought of distant stars spinning around a fixed earth every 24 hours and taught everything that he could about Copernicus to Kepler.

In November 1572 Maestlin and many others around the world witnessed a strange light in the sky that we now know was a galactic supernova. Maestlin attempted to explain this phenomenon in his tract entitled Demonstratio astronomica loci stellae novae, tum respectu centri mundi, tum respectu signiferi & aequinoctialis. This tract of Maestlin's was a short mathematical and  astronomical appendix detailing the nova and was published in Tübingen in March or April of 1573. This nova was called the Nova of Cassiopeia and was the first galactic supernova to be observed in Europe. Maestlin's treatise attracted the attention of Tycho Brahe, who reproduced it in  its entirety, along with his criticism, in one of the best known publications on the nova, in his posthumously printed Astronomiae instauratae progymnasmata.

The programme of Maestlin's treatise of 1573 over the supernova was practically identical to that of Tycho Brahe's longer treatise De stella nova, which published in the same year two or three months later. Tycho's Progymnasmata, was also nearly identical to Maestlin's treaties, which was finished latter in 1592 but published only in 1602, a year after Tycho Brahe's death.

Maestlin in following the copernicium solar system believed that the "movement of commutation" (or "parallactic motion") of the superior planets, those being planets with a farther distance from the sun compared to the earth, and the lack of parallactic motion in the nova meant that the nova had to occur outside the planetary rings and in the ring of fixed stars. This nova occurring in the ring of fixed stars contradicted the previous understandings of Ptolemaic and Aristotelian. Maestlin also concluded that the nova helped to prove the heliocentric solar system as he said unless people concede that comets can be placed in the stellar orb, whose altitude is immense and whose extension we do not know, to which also the distance between the Sun and the Earth is incomparable, as witnessed by Copernicus.

In 1580, Maestlin observed another comet and began to gather up some ideas on how it formed. Nine years later in 1589, Maestlin shared his conclusions about the appearance of the comet with his friend the astrologer, Helisaeus Roeslin, who said that the moon was located in front of the Great Comet of 1577, Also this same year, Maestlin published a dissertation on the fundamental principles of astronomy and the first edition of his book Epitome Astronomiae (Epitome of Astronomy).  Epitome Astonomiae consisted of six editions and used works like Ptolemy's famous geocentric model to create his descriptions of astronomy.

The preface in the 1596 republication of Rheticus' Narratio Prima was also written by Maestlin. This preface was an introduction to the work of Copernicus. Additionally, Maestlin made many contributions to tables and diagrams in Kepler's Mysterium Cosmographicum. Kepler's publication of Mysterium Cosmographicum was supervised by Maestlin, in which he added his own appendix to the publication over Copernican planetary theory with help from Erasmus Reinhold's Prutenic Tables. The information Maestlin used for his appendix from the Prutenic Tables, by Erasmus Reinhold, was used to help readers that were not well educated in astronomy to be able to read Johannes Kepler's Mysterium Cosmographicum as not much information over the basics was included. A discussion of the great sphere and the lunar sphere, as well as more discussion and conclusions to his descriptions of the Copernican planetary theory was also added by Maestlin in Kepler's book. Maestlin's appendix was written more than once, and in the final version he wrote the appendix in correspondence to "the needs of a hypothetical educated reader". However, Maestlin also answered the questions Kepler had while writing the Mysterium Cosmographicum in his appendix.

Maestlin and Kepler communicated through a series of letters about Kepler's book the Mysterium Cosmographim  in which Maestlin added his appendix "On the Dimensions of the Heavenly Circles and Spheres, according to the Prutenic tables after the theory of Nicolaus Copernicus" This appendix contained a set of planetary distances in addition to a method of deriving them from the Prutenic tables. Maestlin also added his own understanding of Nicolaus Copernicus' geometry to Kepler's book. When. Maestlin and Kepler were communicating through letters regarding Kepler's book the discussed such topics such as the inaccuracy of the values that Copernicus used when calculating the spheres of the cosmos.

With the help of Maestlin in 1595, Kepler believed that he had discovered the relationship between the planets period and the distance from the sun. He did so by first assuming equal velocity of each planet and then observing that the planets did not just revolve just according to the length of their radii. Kepler observed that the sun exerted a force that was progressively attenuated as planets are farther and farther away from the sun itself. Maestlin even provided the geometry to help visualize Kepler's theory of the sun force and its effects of the other planets.

While frequent in communication with Kepler through the form of letters during the years 1594 to 1600, Maestlin appeared to quit the dialogue with his former student. Kepler, eager to keep the conversation alive, wrote more letters to which he would receive no response. This lasted between the years of 1600 to 1605. It is said that Maestlin's period of silence ensued due to his fear that Kepler would publish their letters of correspondence. There have been other reasons speculated as to why Maestlin cut off communication with his disciple Kepler including a personal crisis in reaction to rumors of his own suicide. Kepler, frustrated with his teacher's refusal to continue their written communication, complained in a letter dated December 14, 1604, to respond about his thoughts on the nova recently discovered and highly discussed. To not write about this event would to Kepler make Maestlin guilty of "crime of deserting astronomy". Maestlin finally began talking again the month after this letter, around the end of January 1605. In this letter he accomplished several things. He first explained and gave reason to his silence as being because there was nothing more of use to add to the prior explanations concerning the questions Kepler had addressed to him. In regard to the nova, he deduced that it was in fact just a star that had previously not been discovered or noticed.

Astronomy 
While Maestlin had many interests like calendar reform and mathematics, he was above all, an astronomer. He spent much time researching the sun, moon, and eclipses. His 1596 work, Disputatio de Eclipsibus is almost entirely about the sun and the moon and is often referred to in Kepler's 1604 work, Astronomiae pars optica . In 1587, Maestlin published a manuscript entitled Tabula Motus Horarii in which he gives the daily motion of the sun in hours and minutes with its positions in two-minute intervals. There are a few other tables he published that gives equivalent information but in degrees, minutes, and seconds.

Maestlin is also responsible for adding an appendix to Kepler's Mysterium and, based on correspondence with Kepler, which he had frequently, he is known to have been more involved in the editing process of its creation. Maestlin and his former student, Kepler, have been known to have had frequent correspondence via letters, however, there was a time when Maestlin stopped responding to Keplers messages. When he finally started responding to Kepler's letters again, he explained his silence in that he wouldn't have been able to add anything of meaning to Kepler's requests for help with his work, however, this Maestlin would prove his own statement wrong by being greatly involved in Kepler's work in the future. Maestlin was involved in Kepler's Mysterium in that he added diagrams of his views on the order of the planets and the spacing between them to clarify his point. This was the first time such a thing had been done. These very diagrams are what caused a misunderstanding that lasted over centuries. Maestlin did not make it clear whether the planets were supposed to be moving on the lines of the circles that were supposed to represent his planetary system, or whether they were meant to be moving within the spaces drawn by Maestlin. This led to many people believing that the planetary system suggested by Copernicus included a smaller number of modifications (such as epicycles) than that of Ptolemy, when the very opposite was the case. Despite the confusion these diagrams caused, Maestlin contributed greatly to Kepler's Mysterium, which even lead Kepler so far as to acknowledge Maestlin's co-authoring the book in a letter Maestlin.

Maestlin's added appendix also contained more than just the set of planetary distances and their methods of derivation from the tables of corrections. On top of this, he included an assessment of the Copernican models, including his understanding of the geometry behind these models for the earth, moon, and other planets. In what would be the final form of the appendix Maestlin also discusses his student, Kepler, and the quality of his findings and knowledge on the subject of astronomy.

Maestlin's treatise on the nova of 1572 featured many aspects extremely similar to Tycho de Brahe's much longer treatise on the same nova titled De Stella Nova. Both were published the same year, 1602, even though Maestlin's was thought to be written much earlier. In this treatise, Maestlin focused extensively on the mathematics behind the new star's exact location.

In accordance to the Copernican view of the heavens, Johannes Kepler calculated there to be empty spaces between the planetary orbs of the heavens, and Maestlin suggested that these empty spaces might be where comets frequently occur. This sort of revelation was only possible under the assumption of a heliocentric universal organization. Maestlin is believed to have come to this heliocentric view after observing the path of a comet in 1577. When that comet appeared, Maestlin, along with the Danish astronomer Tycho Brahe were the first people who actively tried to calculate its path in a more complex way than simply track its path in the sky. Tycho Brahe and Maestlin in tracking the comet deduced that the comet was not only travelling across the sky but it was going through Aristotle's and Ptolemy's solid geocentric orbs suggesting that the spheres of planets were not solid as previous astronomers believed.

In 1604, Maestlin was one of the first astronomers able to observe the 1604 Supernova (later dubbed Kepler's Supernova) on 9 October 1604. He made his observations visually without instruments and took intense personal note of his observations, however, did not immediately publish them. Instead, he began working on a treatise, entitled Consideratio Astronomica inusitatae Novae et prodigiosae Stellae, superiori 1604 anno, sub initium Octobris, iuxta Eclipticam in signo Sagittarii vesperi exortae, et adhuc nunc eodem loco lumine corusco lucentis (Astronomical consideration of the extraordinary and prodigious new star that appeared near the ecliptic in the sign of Sagittarius one evening in early October in the preceding year 1604, and continues to shine in the same place with a tremulous light) with the intent to publish it in the coming years. He began seriously working on the treatise in 1606, however, it was never fully completed.

In 1613, Maestlin obtained his first set of telescopes. In a letter to Kepler, Maestlin says he was unable to view the satellites of Saturn or the phases of Venus, however, he was able to see the moons of Jupiter.

A conference was held in Tubingen (where Maestlin was a professor at the university) in 2000 on Maestlin and his life and works. From these, Gerhard Betsch  Gerhard Betsch produced a collective volume on their findings and breakdown of his works as well as a summary of Maestlin's nachlass, a german word meaning collection of manuscripts, notes, letters, correspondence, etc. left behind when a scholar passes. His nachlass had been kept and preserved among different library archives in both Germany and Austria. Betsch discussed many things in his dissertation including a treatise composed by Maestlin on the Comet of 1618-1619 written completely in German. An important work Betsch failed to mention was Maestlin's treatise on the Comet of 1604. This work, written completely in Latin this time, was titled Consideratio Astronomica inusitatae Novae et prodigiosae Stellae, superiori 1604 anno, sub initium Octobris, iuxta Eclipticam in signo Sagittarii vesperi exortae, et adhuc nunc eodem loco lumine corusco lucentis. Or in english, Astronomical consideration of the extraordinary and prodigious new star that appeared near the ecliptic in the sign of Sagittarius one evening in early October in the preceding year 1604, and continues to shine in the same place with a tremulous light. The work consisted of a view of his thoughts on the comet and extends just over 12 pages but is problematic to read. There are many cancellations and additions as well as notes and marks on words. The work is also unfinished which leads scholars to believe either Maestlin failed to finish or the final pages have been lost sometime in the past centuries. The best estimated date for his treatise has been noted as April 1605. Maestlin describes the months of February or March when the comet showed signs of decreasing intensity and brightness. He estimated its expiration or disappearance for May of the same year. His reasoning for this estimation came from the fact that the sun would be in opposition with the nova at this point in time. He discusses extensively the intensity and magnitude of the nova and how it differs from the patterns seen in previous novas such as that of 1572. This comet of 1572 was first seen at a certain magnitude and like others before and after it, experienced a constant decreasing throughout its visibility. This comet of 1604 however, maintained a large magnitude for sometime as a first-magnitude star like that of Venus and the other brightest stars.

Christianity
During the days of Maestlin and Kepler, it could be considered dangerous business to be questioning God's responsibility for creating the world and all the creatures in it, because one might be accused of blasphemy. Maestlin saw things in a different light, however. He was a follower of the Lutheran church, and as such, he believed that studying the natural world and unraveling the laws that embody it will bring humanity closer to God. In Maestlin's opinion, understanding God's creations will enable his children to be closer to him and his divine plan. He further believed that finding out more about the natural world we live in will enrich the knowledge we have of God. Maestlin at one time had even been a Lutheran pastor.

Michael Maestlin used his notability to project his religious and political views. In 1582, Maestlin voiced his view in treaties on the new Gregorian calendar and its creation.  His arguments focused on mathematics perceptive and political perceptive. He agreed that Julian calendar was inaccurate and that it states a year to be 365 days and 6 hours long, but as Maestiling said, the year is "365 days, five hours, forty-nine minutes and 46 thirds long". Also, he discusses that the golden numbers are calculated wrong. While his argument with mathematics mostly supports the replacement of the Julian calendar, his argument for political reasons differ. Maestlin was against the adoption of the Gregorian calendar even though he believed there was a need for a new accurate calendar. He argues that the need for a new calendar was known for two hundred years, but nothing was done. He suggested that the reason that calendar was being adopted now was because the catholic church lost power, and the Pope wanted "to further his dominion". This stems from Maestlin's dislike of the position of the Pope, which is shown by his statement, the Pope does not direct "the movements of the sun and moon". Maestlin believed that the Pope was trying to project power into countries that rather recently rid the Pope's powers. Then he suggested that only educated people would notice the problems with the calendar. He believed the judgment day in the year 2000, which with the Julian calendar is an inaccuracy of three days. So he does not believe the correction is worth it.

Notable astronomical observations
Catalogued the Pleiades cluster on 24 December 1579. Eleven stars in the cluster were recorded by Maestlin, and possibly as many as fourteen were observed.
Occultation of Mars by Venus on 13 October 1590, seen by Maestlin at Heidelberg.
Observed the Supernova of 1604 (Kepler's Supernova) on 9 October 1604 but did not begin to publicly record the observation until 1606

Legacy
Asteroid 11771 Maestlin, discovered in 1973
Lunar Crater: Maestlin
Lunar Rille: Rimae Maestlin

In Jules Verne's Cinq semaines en ballon (Five Weeks in a Balloon) the character of Joe, the manservant, is described as enjoying, "in common with Moestlin, Kepler's professor, the rare faculty of distinguishing the satellites of Jupiter with the naked eye, and of counting fourteen of the stars in the group of Pleiades, the remotest of them being only of the ninth magnitude."

Michael Maestlin has more than one piece of art that is in memoriam to him. The first is a woodcut portrait that was solely made for Maestlin. The second one is part of a monument that was made for Johannes Kepler in Weil-der-Stadt, which was Kepler's hometown. Kepler's monument has four statues of those who deeply influenced his work in astronomy, and needless to say, one of them is of Michael Maestlin. The third art work of Maestlin is a plaque, which is also on Kepler's monument, that shows Maestlin teaching Kepler and his other students.

Literature

See also 
 Golden ratio
 Johannes Kepler
 Copernican heliocentrism
 History of Mars observation

References

External links
 MacTutor Biography of Michael Mästlin 
 
 Complete translated text of Five Weeks in a Balloon from Project Gutenberg (English)
Online Galleries, History of Science Collections, University of Oklahoma Libraries  High resolution images of works by and/or portraits of Michael Maestlin in .jpg and .tiff format.

1550 births
1631 deaths
16th-century German astronomers
German astrologers
16th-century astrologers
17th-century astrologers
16th-century German mathematicians
17th-century German mathematicians
Johannes Kepler
16th-century German writers
16th-century German male writers
17th-century German writers
17th-century German male writers
17th-century German astronomers
Academic staff of the University of Tübingen